Kolpakovo is a rural locality (a village) in Yudinskoye Rural Settlement, Velikoustyugsky District, Vologda Oblast, Russia. The population was 9 as of 2002.

Geography 
Kolpakovo is located 13 km northeast of Veliky Ustyug (the district's administrative centre) by road. Zapan Bobrovnikovo is the nearest rural locality.

References 

Rural localities in Velikoustyugsky District